The .356 Winchester is a semi-rimmed, bottle-necked, centerfire rifle cartridge which was designed for use in lever-action rifles. It was developed concurrently with the .307 Winchester which acted as the parent cartridge. Both cartridges were introduced in 1982 in the then-new Model 94 XTR lever-action rifle.

Description

The .356 Winchester was developed using the case similar to that of the .308 Winchester but which featured a semi-rimmed design so as to operate through a lever-action rifle. Hence the .358 Winchester, which is essentially .308 Winchester necked up to accept a  bullet, is very similar to that of the .356 Winchester, with the only difference being the design of the rim.

Performance of the .356 Winchester is close to that of the .358 Winchester giving up only  with any bullet weight. However, the .356 has slightly less case capacity than the .358 Winchester due to its thicker brass case. Furthermore, heavier bullets will need to be seated more deeply than in the .358 Winchester as the cartridge has to function reliably through a lever rifle's feeding mechanism.

The Marlin Model 336ER was offered in .356 Winchester for several years, but was discontinued in 1987. The same year, Winchester ceased production of their Model 94s chambered for .356 Winchester. It was brought back immediately in 1988, but was again discontinued in the mid-1990s.

Despite its nomenclature, the .356 Winchester actually uses a .358 caliber bullet. Olin engineers who developed the .356 Winchester advise against loading it with anything other than flat-nose or Hornady 
Leverevolution bullets if it is to be used in a tubular-magazine lever-rifle. If it were being loaded for use in a single-shot or double-rifle, any bullet type could be used.

Dimensions

See also
List of rifle cartridges
Glossary of firearms terminology

References

External links

 .356 Winchester for Whitetail Deer Hunting? Best Ammo (Round, Load, Cartridge) for a Successful Whitetail Deer Hunt
 .356 Winchester

Pistol and rifle cartridges
Winchester Repeating Arms Company cartridges